Arizona Bay is an album by American stand-up comedian and satirist Bill Hicks, posthumously released in 1997. Both this album and a similar album of new material, Rant in E-Minor, were released posthumously by Rykodisc on February 25, 1997, marking three years since Hicks' death.

The album's title refers to the hope that Los Angeles will one day fall into the ocean due to a major earthquake. Hicks contends that the world will be better off in L.A.'s absence:

On April 28, 2015, Comedy Dynamics released a new version of the album in the digital format called Arizona Bay Extended, featuring "a raw and uncut show that comprised the original Arizona Bay album."

Musical content
Several of Hicks's albums are unique in that they feature background music, meant to enhance the album's mood. Such additions were made well after the initial recordings and are the product of Hicks's own musicianship.

According to Kevin Booth, in the BBC documentary Dark Poet, it was during the early recording sessions for Arizona Bay, around Christmas 1992, that Hicks first started suffering from the pains in his side, which would later be diagnosed as pancreatic cancer. Upon learning that he had developed cancer, Hicks used his time to mix music into Rant in E-Minor and Arizona Bay, calling it his Dark Side of the Moon.

Legacy 
In 1996, one year prior to the release of Hicks' Arizona Bay album, American rock band Tool released the album Ænima, which contains several references to Hicks. The title song of the album echoes the theme of Los Angeles being submerged in the ocean and includes the lyrics, "Learn to swim, see you down in Arizona Bay." Additionally, there is artwork inside the album booklet showing a map of California before and after the earthquake, as well as a caricature of Hicks himself, cited as "another dead hero".

The song "Third Eye" also contains references to several Hicks routines:

Who's that talking at the start of "Third Eye"? - That would be the aforementioned Bill Hicks; those are snips of comedy routines of his, from "The War on Drugs" (off his CD Dangerous) and "Drugs Have Done Good Things" (off Relentless). In fact, on his CD Rant in E-Minor, he refers to the power that heavy doses of hallucinogens have to "squeegee his third eye."

Track listing 

All music composed by Bill Hicks

Arizona Bay Extended

Personnel 
 Bill Hicks - guitar, vocals
 Kevin Booth - bass, keyboards, percussion, producer

References 

Bill Hicks albums
1997 live albums
Live albums published posthumously
1990s comedy albums
Live comedy albums
Spoken word albums by American artists
Live spoken word albums
Rykodisc albums
Stand-up comedy albums